A parenthesis (plural parentheses) is a type of bracket used for punctuation.

It may also refer to:
 Parenthesis (rhetoric), an explanatory or qualifying word in a passage or statement.
 In Parenthesis, an epic poem of World War 1 by David Jones.
 Emphasis! (On Parenthesis), an album by the Stanton Moore Trio.
 Lecithocera parenthesis, a moth in the family Lecithoceridae.
 Triple parentheses (also known as an (((echo)))) are a symbol used to highlight the names of individuals of a Jewish background.

See also
 Bracket (disambiguation)
 Math symbol parentheses (disambiguation)
 (disambiguation)